Colin Cameron McVicar (3 June 1916 – 17 February 1987) was a New Zealand cricketer who played five matches of first-class cricket for Central Districts between January 1951 and January 1952.

An opening batsman, Colin McVicar made his first-class debut at the age of 34 in Central Districts' second match in the 1950-51 season. It was also Central Districts' debut season, and they had lost their first match, but this time, playing for the first time at home, they won, defeating Canterbury at Fitzherbert Park in Palmerston North. In a low-scoring match McVicar top-scored in the first innings with 42 and took three catches in Canterbury's first innings. Central Districts also won their next match, another low-scoring match, McVicar making 29 and 40. In subsequent matches he was less successful with the bat, and lost his spot after five matches. 

McVicar had already had a long and successful career for Manawatu in the Hawke Cup during  Manawatu's period of dominance from 1934-35 to 1946-47. He was the competition's leading run-scorer in 1937-38, 1945-46 and 1946-47. The Colin McVicar Trust supported the Manawatu Cricket Association until 2008, when the trust's money was transferred to the Manawatu Cricket Investment Fund.     

McVicar served with the New Zealand Army in World War II and was taken prisoner in 1942. His brother Stuart also played first-class cricket, and their father Alec was a stalwart for Manawatu for more than 20 years. The practice facilities at Fitzherbert Park are named after the McVicar family.

References

External links
 

1916 births
1987 deaths
Cricketers from Palmerston North
New Zealand cricketers
Central Districts cricketers
New Zealand military personnel of World War II